Gary Irvine (born 17 March 1985) is a Scottish professional footballer and manager. He has previously played for Celtic, Ross County, St Johnstone, Dundee and St Mirren and Forfar Athletic, the last of which he also performed the role of player-manager for.

Career

Celtic & Ross County
Irvine started his career at Celtic, but failed to make an appearance for the club during his time there.

At the start of the 2006–07 season, he moved on loan to Ross County. During his time at County, he was involved as they won the 2006–07 Scottish Challenge Cup, beating Clyde on penalties.

St Johnstone
After leaving Celtic, Irvine signed for Scottish First Division side St Johnstone. In his first season at McDiarmid Park, he won the 2007–08 Scottish Challenge Cup, his second winners medal in that competition in successive seasons, with St Johnstone winning 3–2 against Dunfermline Athletic. The following season, he was part of the squad as St Johnstone won the Scottish First Division. At the end of the 2009–10 season he was one of eight players released by the club. Irvine scored once during his spell at the club; his goal coming in a 3–1 win over Dunfermline Athletic in April 2009.

Dundee
On 24 July 2010, Irvine signed for Dundee, of the Scottish First Division. In July 2012, with Dundee having been promoted to the Scottish Premier League after the demotion of Rangers, he signed a new deal with the club, despite interest from several Scottish Premier League clubs including his former team, Ross County. After Dundee's relegation from the Scottish Premier League, Irvine agreed terms on a new contract for the 2013–14 season.

St Mirren
On 29 January 2016 Saints signed Irvine from Dundee until the end of the season, with the option of a further year. He was released by St Mirren at the end of the 2017–18 season.

Forfar Athletic
Irvine joined Forfar Athletic in February 2019, until the end of the season. On 9 April 2021, Irvine agreed to take charge of the Loons after manager Stuart Malcolm and his assistants resigned from their positions. Irvine was announced as the club's new manager on 4 May. Despite coming close to promotion in the 2021–22 season, a very disappointing start to the following season which left the Loons bottom of the table led to Forfar releasing Irvine on 9 November 2022.

Career statistics

Managerial record

initially caretaker.
includes League Cup forfeit win over Ross County on 8th July 2021 after the club cancelled scheduled fixture due to Co-vid.

International career
Irvine was capped twice for the Scotland under–21s, against Iceland and Turkey
in 2006.

Honours
Ross County
Scottish Challenge Cup: 2006–07

St Johnstone
Scottish First Division: 2008–09
Scottish Challenge Cup: 2007–08

Dundee
Scottish Championship: 2013–14

St. Mirren
Scottish Championship: 2017–18

References

https://www.rosscountyfootballclub.co.uk/news-items/covid-19-update-2

External links
Gary Irvine profile Dundee official website

 1 Ross County appearance in 2006–07

1985 births
Celtic F.C. players
Association football defenders
Living people
Footballers from Bellshill
Ross County F.C. players
Scotland under-21 international footballers
Scottish Football League players
Scottish footballers
St Johnstone F.C. players
Dundee F.C. players
Scottish Premier League players
Scottish Professional Football League players
St Mirren F.C. players
Forfar Athletic F.C. players